Cervimunida johni is a species of squat lobster in the family Munididae. It is found in the Pacific Ocean, off of Chile. It is known to be host to the parasite Bathione humboldtensis.

References

Squat lobsters
Crustaceans described in 1903